Since 1900, a total of eight registered provincial parties have existed in Prince Edward Island.

Parties represented in the Legislative Assembly

Other registered parties

Historical parties 
 Garden Party
 Progressive Party of Prince Edward Island

References

External links
 Registered Political Parties at Elections PEI

 
Parties
Prince Edward Island

fr:Partis politiques canadiens#Île-du-Prince-Édouard